Manohara Kudagodage (born 30 October 1972) is a Sri Lankan former cricketer. He played in 32 first-class and 7 List A matches between 1995/96 and 2004/05. He made his Twenty20 debut on 17 August 2004, for Sri Lanka Police Sports Club in the 2004 SLC Twenty20 Tournament.

References

External links
 

1972 births
Living people
Sri Lankan cricketers
Sri Lanka Police Sports Club cricketers
Place of birth missing (living people)